The  is the legislature of Osaka City. It is responsible for the "enactment, amendment and repeal of ordinances, budgetary decisions, approval of account settlements, matters of financial importances including acquisition and disposal of city assets, and others." The assembly has a regular membership 83 members, with 42 needed to form a majority.

Overview 

Members: 83
Term: 4 years
Voting System: Medium‐size constituency system (Single non-transferable vote)
President: Shoichi Kakutani（Osaka Restoration Association）
Vice-President: Yoshitaka Tsuji（Komeito）

The municipal government consists of 24 electoral districts, representing the 24 administrative wards of the city. The number of members elected from each district is proportional to the ward's population.

Members are elected to four-year terms with no term limits. Japanese citizens of voting age who have been living in Osaka city continuously for three months have the right to vote in municipal government elections, and people with voting rights who are at least 25 years old may stand as candidates.

Members meet quarterly for the regular assembly, additional extraordinary sessions are also held. There are six standing committees of the Osaka municipal government: Finance and General Affairs, Education and Economic Affairs, Public Welfare and Health, Planning and Fire Defense, Construction and Port, and Transport and Waterworks.

The municipal government meets on the 7th (government library, special committee room) and 8th (meeting hall, committee room, city government secretariat, president's office) floors of Osaka City Hall.

Representatives' compensation and benefits

Current composition 
The 2019 municipal assembly election took place on 7 April 2019 as part of the 19th unified local elections. Prior to the election, the council was reduced in size from 86 to 83 seats.

The Osaka Restoration Association, retained its position as the largest party in the assembly but failed to claim a majority as it holds in the Osaka Prefectural Assembly. The election saw the Osaka Restoration Association gain six seats, while all other parties lost seats (Liberal Democratic Party -4, Komeito -1, Communist Party -5). The Constitutional Democratic Party, the national opposition party, failed to gain a seat.

The 7 April 2019 general election of members of the council gave the following result:

References 

Politics of Osaka
City councils in Japan